Michael Rowland (born 8 July 1968) is an Australian television news presenter and journalist, currently working for the Australian Broadcasting Corporation, having previously been an American affairs correspondent in Washington. Additionally, he has been a financial, economic and political reporter for several Australian News channels. Rowland has edited and written several articles and books, such as Black Summer (2021) and "ABC news channel in 2020".

He is currently co-host of the ABC's morning program News Breakfast alongside Lisa Millar, and is the network's senior presenter. His frequent collaborations include presenters from News Breakfast, including Millar, sports presenter Tony Armstrong, finance presenter Madeleine Morris, and weather presenter Nate Byrne. Rowland has also worked alongside other Australian news presenters such as Virginia Troili and Barrie Cassidy.

Early life
Michael Rowland was born in Victoria, Australia before moving to Sydney, New South Wales. During his teenage years, he attended De La Salle College Ashfield and graduated in year 12. He went on to achieve a bachelor's in communication from the University of Technology Sydney. Growing up around rugby league and rugby union in Sydney's inner-west gave birth to his love of sports; he is a supporter of the AFL team the Western Bulldogs. In his earlier years he was hit in his eye by a stray pellet from a slingshot, causing it to dilate uncontrollably. This injury is resulted in being lifelong causing him to be anxious and nervous surrounding its visibility in his earlier parts of life.  Rowland has also expressed that he does suffer some colour blindness but this does not stem from his childhood accident.

Career
Michael Rowland began his career in the news industry by reporting and journalism in the 1990s where he spent five years in the ABC's Parliament House bureau in Canberra, filing for Radio News and Lateline. During this time he learnt about news reporting and journalism as a news cadet for over a year. Michael Rowland worked in the Canberra Press gallery for five years covering both New South Wales and Victorian politic for the Australian Broadcasting Corporation. In 1988, he transferred to a position as an NSW state political reporter directly from the cadet role in ABC's Parliament House bureau in Canberra. He then progressed to a finance reporter in 1991 for the Australian Broadcasting Corporation. He met his future News Breakfast co-host Lisa Millar while covering the 1996 federal election at ABC's Canberra Bureau.

Rowland was previously North America correspondent, and during his posting covered stories including the election of Barack Obama as US president, the outbreak of the financial crisis of 2007–2008, the Virginia Tech massacre and David Hicks' release from Guantanamo Bay detention camp.

Before going to the United States as the Australian Broadcasting corporation's American correspondent, he was Lateline finances correspondent, and also covered business and economics for a range of other ABC TV and radio outlets including AM, current affairs morning program, The World Today, a current affairs program, PM, the midday report run by the ABC, Inside Business, the economic and financial focused branch of ABC and the 7 pm TV news all of which included Rowland as the financial presenter focussing on Australian economics.

In June 2010, Rowland was appointed co-host of News Breakfast, replacing Joe O'Brien and has continued working on the ABC's morning breakfast segment till the current day.

In June 2019, ABC announced that Rowland would take on an expanded role as senior network presenter for ABC's morning news breakfast segment. In addition to News Breakfast, Rowland would anchor coverage of major domestic and international events across ABC News programs, including the 7 pm News, the breakfast segment for ABC's news, and ABC radio.

In November 2020, Rowland covered the 2020 United States presidential election presenting live result of the ABC news segment as a temporary American correspondent.

In January 2021 HarperCollins published Black Summer: Stories of loss, courage and community from the 2019–2020 bushfires, was edited by Michael Rowland, with proceeds being contributed to the Red Cross Disaster Relief and Recovery Fund, as a means to provide support to the families who lost loved ones and homes during the 2020 bushfires within Australia.

ABC Radio News and current affairs
From 1993 to 1998, Rowland joined ABC Radio News, where he still visits occasionally to present and co-host, reporting on Australian affairs including economic and political news. During Rowland's duration working at the ABC radio station, his position included co-hosting on the financial news and providing a segment during the current affairs news segment reporting on financial and economic changes and its state within Australia and Wall street in America.

Victorian State political reporter
From 1998 to 2001, Rowland was the Victorian State political reporter for ABC News, reporting mainly major live events that were occurring and usually the political party movement in victoria.

Business and finance reporter
From 2001 to 2004, Rowland was a business and finance reporter for AM, an informative morning current affairs program, The World Today, a current affairs program, PM, the midday report run by the ABC, Inside Business, the economic and financial focused branch of ABC and the 7 pm TV news broadcast across Australia. Tow which he would have his own segment or interview with Australian politicians regarding financial initiatives and what their effect would have on the Australian trade and economy.

Lateline
From late 2004 to 2005, Rowland worked with Lateline on a questionnaire and reporting shows for the ABC as an economics and business correspondent. During his time there, he edited several articles and appeared several times on the show to provide insight into the finical situation within Australia.

ABC American correspondent
Rowland was the ABC's correspondent in Washington from 2005 to 2009. During this time, he reported the US presidential election and was ABC's Wall Street correspondent during the height of the global financial crisis. He also presented a major event in the US in 2008 following the Obama administration and affairs in the USA politics. Rowland reappear in this role for the United States presidential election 2020 covering it live during the coronavirus outbreak. Rowland covering the election in 2020 in Washington DC as a means to provide insight for Australian viewers of the ABC breakfast show on US politics at the time. During which time he reported both online answering viewers question whilst presenting on the street live whilst the final results from the Us election were occurring. During this time, Rowland was also reporting the surges of COVID-19 outbreaks and the ways it was changing the potential outcome of election results. Highlighting the death toll and how the need for mail-in ballots could change the outcome of the election in any way during the time.

ABC News Breakfast
Rowland began his current career for ABC by presenting on ABC News Breakfast since the launch of ABC News 24 in July 2010. On Monday, May 2011, the News Breakfast hosted by Virginia Troili and Michael Rowland, moved from the ABC2 channel to ABC1. Through this move, News Breakfast had new segments such as "The Party Line", with interviews with political leaders and newsmakers. This also changed the news focus on local and regional issues in Australia and aimed to move the presenter around to where crises were occurring. In 2019, Rowland was a live correspondent for the show, reporting on the wild bushfires that struck Australia and interviewing firefighters and residents of towns such as Wytaliba in north-east New South Wales. Rowland has also interviewed a large array of Australian ministers such as Stuart Robert, the Minister for Employment, Workforce, Skills, Small and Family Business, the Trade Minister Dan Tehan regarding the distribution of vaccine in Australia, Karen Andrews the minister for Home Affairs, and Josh Frydenberg the Treasurer of the Commonwealth of Australia are just some examples of important Australia minister Michael Rowland has interview individually. During his time on News Breakfast, he has also had the opportunity to interview every sitting Prime Minister of Australia from the past decades, including Kevin Rudd, Julia Gillard, Tony Abbott, Malcolm Turnbull and Scott Morrison.

Personal life
In November 2020, while in hotel quarantine after returning from covering the US presidential election, Rowland made one appearance on News Breakfast that elicited a strong response from the audience. Viewers saw that his eyes had markedly different pupil (iris) openings. He explained that when he was 19, his right eye was struck by a pellet from a slingshot. After being rushed to the Sydney Eye Hospital and surgeries being conducted on the eye, it has been permanently dilated. Rowland disclosed that in later in life his iris rarely dilates and, after some time, will return to its normal state 

Michael Rowland is married to Nicola Webber. Rowland also has two children and discloses throughout his social media platforms that he a heavy family orientated person.

Rowland is a fan of the Western Bulldogs, and began supporting them after returning from the United States to co-anchor ABC News Breakfast when it launched midway through 2010. He only began to enjoy the sport after the age of 40. He has also expressed that the majority of the reason why he follows the team is due to settling in Melbourne, at which time the sport became an integral part of his family. Another reason he disclosed was due to his 5-year-old supporting the team. In 2016, he interviewed the Western Bulldogs president Peter Gordon on News Breakfast less than 48 hours after the club ended its 62-year-long Premiership losing streak. Rowland has described this experience as a big highlight in his years on the show, with Gordon allowing him to hold onto the AFL Premiership Cup. Rowland has also disclosed that of his interviews with countless celebrities on News Breakfast, his favourite was with the American actor Alan Alda, who appeared on the show to promote science education.

Other forms of journalism
Michael Rowland was the vice president for the Melbourne Press Club for a time. However, he resigned in 2019 due to conflict between two other major members of the board. He is still considered a life member of the club, and has been acknowledged by them for his work and contribution to the club and journalism.

During 2020, Rowland has also written and edited several articles within the ABC website regarding the COVID-19 outbreaks within both the US and the Australian environment. The article provides ongoing insight toward the COVID-19 outbreak that occurred mainly within 2020 and 2021 for both the United States and Australia. These articles both aim to outline the current guidelines and rules that are enacted by each respective government and ways to either person can maintain their health in the current climate. Rowland has published numerous articles through the ABC such as “Michael Rowland and Norman Swan got AstraZeneca vaccines. Here's what happened” as an example.

He has published and edited several ABC News online articles, on political and financial topics such as "The mood inside the White House: Sullen and stubborn, but without a grand strategy," and "I wanted to see the drought for myself. I didn't expect to see this." He has also edited for the book Black Summer: stories of loss, courage and community from the 2019-2020 bushfires, published in January 2021. It contains stories and overviews from several people that experienced the Australian Bushfires in 2019 and 2020. Other events he has covered include the Delhi Commonwealth Games in 2010, the Bali bombing tenth anniversary, the Thredbo disaster in 1997, and an assortment of Royal tours throughout the years in Australia.

References

External links
ABC News profile

Living people
ABC News (Australia) presenters
Australian television journalists
1968 births